San Sebastián is the eleventh district of the San José canton, in the San José province of Costa Rica. An important residential district, San Sebastián is the third most populous and second most densely populated in the canton.

Geography 
San Sebastián has an area of  km² and an elevation of  metres.
It shares its southern border with San José Province's Alajuelita and Desamparados cantons. The district also limits its counterparts, counterclockwise: Hatillo District (west), Hospital and Catedral districts to the north, and San Francisco de Dos Ríos District to the east.

Demographics 

For the 2011 census, San Sebastián had a population of  inhabitants.

Locations 
San Sebastián District includes the "barrios" (or neighbourhoods) of Bajos Canada, Bengala, Bilbao, Cañada Sur, Carmen, Cascajal, Cerro Azul, Colombari, Colonia Kennedy, Guacamaya, Hogar Propio, Jazmin, Lopez Mateo, Los Geranios, Los Olivos, Luna Park, Mojados, Mojito, Parque de La Paz, Paso Ancho, Pavi, Presidentes, San Gerardo, San Martín, San Sebastián, Santa Rosa, Santo Domingo Sabio, Seminario, Galenos, Umará and Zorobarú.

Transportation

Road transportation 
The district is covered by the following road routes:
 National Route 39
 National Route 175
 National Route 209
 National Route 213
 National Route 214

External links 
Municipalidad de San José. Distrito San Sebastián – Website of San Jose Mayor, includes a map of the district and related info.

References 

Districts of San José Province
Populated places in San José Province